Dejan Pandurevic (/Дејан Пандуревић, born 17 January 1997) is an Australian professional soccer player who plays as a midfielder for Manly United.

Born in Sydney, Pandurevic played youth football with the Nike Academy before making his senior debut for Manly United in 2014. He returned to Manly after a short time with Central Coast Mariners, before moving to Serbia with FK Zemun in 2018.

He has represented Australia under-20.

Early life
Pandurevic is an Australian of Serbian descent.

Club career
In 2014, aged 17, Pandurevic was selected as the Australian representative at the Nike Academy in England.

In December 2014, after returning to Australia, Pandurevic went to Central Coast Mariners on trial. He signed with the Mariners one month later, following in the footsteps of fellow Nike Academy Graduate Tom Rogic. Pandurevic left the club in May 2015 after his contract was not renewed.

Pandurevic then returned to Manly United, where he played 43 games and scored 19 goals in the 2015 and 2016 seasons.

Pandurevic signed with Serbian club FK Zemun during the winter-break of 2017–18 season. He debuted on 21 April 2018 in a Serbian super league game against Javor.

International career
Pandurevic was called to for the qualifying games of Young Socceroos for the 2015 AFF U-19 Youth Championship against the Philippines, Laos and Japan played in October 2015. He scored the 6th goal when he entered as a substitute in the game against the Philippines which ended as an extensive 6–0 win. Then he was called again to be part of the young socceroos training camp held in July 2016. Pandurevic scored twice in their ASEAN Football Federation Under-19 Championship game against Myanmar.

Honours

International 
Australia U20
 AFF U-19 Youth Championship: 2016

References

1997 births
Living people
Soccer players from Sydney
Australian people of Serbian descent
Australian soccer players
Association football midfielders
Manly United FC players
Central Coast Mariners FC players
FK Zemun players
Serbian SuperLiga players
National Premier Leagues players
Expatriate footballers in Serbia
Nike Academy players